The cycling competition at the 1976 Summer Olympics in Montreal consisted of two road cycling events and four track cycling events, all for men only.  The 2000m tandem event, contested at the previous 13 Games since 1908, was dropped from the Olympic cycling program.

Medal summary

Road cycling

Track cycling

Participating nations
295 cyclists from 49 nations competed.

Medal table

References

 
1976 Summer Olympics events
1976
1976 in track cycling
1976 in road cycling